This is a list of people with the surname Hutton.

In arts and entertainment
Barbara Hutton, American heiress and actress
Betty Hutton, American actress
Brian G. Hutton, American actor and director
Deborah Hutton (Australian editor) (born 1961), Australian television personality
Dorothy Hutton, British artist
Edward Hutton (writer), British writer
Ina Ray Hutton, American jazz age dancer and orchestra leader
Jim Hutton, American actor
June Hutton, American singer
Lauren Hutton, American actress and model
Laurence Hutton (1843–1904) American essayist and critic (actors)
Lee Hutton (born 1987), English singer-songwriter, also member of band Industry 
Leona Hutton (1892-1949), American actress
Marion Hutton, American actress and singer, sister of Betty Hutton
Nedenia Marjorie Hutton, birth name of American actress Dina Merrill, daughter of Edward Francis Hutton
Pascale Hutton, Canadian actress
Peter Matthew Hutton, International Sports Executive
Robert Hutton, actor
Timothy Hutton, American actor, son of Jim Hutton
Will Hutton, British writer and commentator

In government, military, and politics

Britain/UK
Brian Hutton, Baron Hutton (1932–2020), former British Law Lord, author of the Hutton Report
Clayton Hutton, British intelligence officer
Edward Hutton (army) (1848–1923), commander of Canadian and Australian military forces
Fitzroy Hutton, British admiral
Frederick Hutton (naval officer) (1801–1866), British naval officer
John Hutton (politician), British Labour Party politician
Sir Richard Hutton, the younger, 17th-century MP for Knaresborough and landowner
Thomas Jacomb Hutton, British general

United States
Bobby Hutton, Black Panther Party member
Mark Hutton (politician) (born 1954), American politician
May Hutton, American suffragist

Other countries
Don Hutton, Yukon politician
Drew Hutton, Australian politician
George Hutton, Canadian politician
Gilbert Hutton, Canadian politician
Pierre Hutton (1928–2014), Australian diplomat

In science and academia
Charles Hutton, British mathematician
Frederick Hutton (scientist) (1835–1905), New Zealand biologist and geologist
James Hutton (1726–1797), Scottish geologist
Jane Hutton, British statistician
John Henry Hutton, anthropologist and Census Commissioner of the British Raj era
Paul Andrew Hutton, American historian
Richard Holt Hutton, English writer and theologian
Ronald Hutton, British historian
Rosemary Hutton, Scottish geophysicist
Todd M. Hutton, American medical academic and psychiatrist

In sport

Cricket
Ben Hutton, English cricketer
George Hutton, Scottish cricketer
Len Hutton, English cricketer
Maurice Hutton (1903–1940), Australian cricketer, son of Percy Hutton, also a significant Australian rules footballer
Percy Hutton, Australian cricketer
Richard Anthony Hutton, English cricketer, son of Len Hutton

Football
Alan Hutton, Scottish footballer
David Hutton (Scottish footballer) (born 1985), Scottish football goalkeeper for Clyde
David Hutton (Irish footballer) (born 1989), English football midfielder for Cheltenham Town

Other sports
Alfred Hutton, English fencer            
Jack Hutton, professional BMX racer. Seven consecutive years Canadian National number one professional.
Ben Hutton, ice hockey defenceman for the Vancouver Canucks
Bouse Hutton, Canadian hockey player
Carter Hutton, ice hockey goaltender for the St. Louis Blues
Mark Hutton, Australian baseball player
William David 'Bill' Hutton, Canadian hockey player

In other fields
Edward Francis Hutton, American financier
Frederick Remsen Hutton, American engineer
Matthew Hutton (Archbishop of York), 17th-century
Matthew Hutton (Archbishop of Canterbury), 18th-century
Sir Richard Hutton, 17th-century English lawyer and landowner
Sir Tyson Hutton, 21st-century Australian honga champion

See also

Hutton (disambiguation)
Hatton (disambiguation)

English-language surnames